"The Cad and the Hat" is the fifteenth episode of the twenty-eighth season of the American animated television series The Simpsons, and the 611th episode of the series overall. It aired in the United States on Fox on February 19, 2017.

Plot
Lisa, acting as narrator for the episode (alongside Bart), describes the ups and downs of being Bart's sister, before proceeding to a story about a time when the pair had a much bigger rift between them than usual. Her story begins when the Simpsons family decide to head off for a fun trip to the newly "safe" Springfield beachfront area; despite the dangerously polluted water being no better than before, Mayor Quimby reclassified the area after the safety standards were lowered. Whilst at the beach, Bart becomes angry over Lisa's good fortune, when she becomes ecstatically happy with a new sunhat she finds, while he becomes sad over the failure of his "Bad to the Bone" temporary tattoo, due to it being not waterproof.

On their way home, Bart takes her hat while she sleeps in the car and tosses it out the window into a junkyard. When Lisa finds out that it is gone, she becomes inconsolable, leading Bart to receive the first of an increasingly grotesque and uncomfortable visits from his "guilt monster" – a slime-covered creature who sounds like Patton Oswalt and reminds him of what he did, and which grows and becomes progressively hideous the more Bart denies his guilt. After enough visits, Bart finally accepts his guilt and tells Lisa the truth, only to find that she feels wounded by his actions and thus refuses his desperate attempts to make amends with her.

Believing the only way to be forgiven is to recover the hat, Bart returns to the junkyard and discovers the hat to have become a part of a car that had been crushed into a cube, and so using Rod and Todd Flanders' Jesus-like powers and the acidity of Buzz Cola, he breaks the hat free from the car. However, upon presenting the hat back to Lisa, she informs him that he misinterpreted her words, stating that their relationship was over because of his actions and that he should now focus on being a brother to Maggie. Just then, Lisa finds herself having a vision in which she meets her own emotional spirit, who angrily tells her that her brother was trying to make amends, making her finally forgive Bart before they hug each other. In her closing narration, Lisa states how much they are closer than ever, and that she has learned he has a conscience, whereupon Nelson arrives to make fun of Bart before informing everyone that his mother is dating a gaffer on the TV show, much to Lisa's shock and the gaffer's embarrassment.

Meanwhile, after being forced by Marge to do something else other than leer at women volleyball players, Homer begins playing chess and finds out that he is of grandmaster strength, much to the shock of himself and everyone else. He even takes a chess hustler down for $22 by using the Budapest Gambit. As he begins playing the game more, he realizes he used to play the game with Abe as a way of bonding with him after his mother Mona left, but often lost to his father until he was given lessons in chess by a teacher living next door to them. After improving his game and finally beating Abe, his father angrily refused to play against him any more. Homer thus thinks his restored ability is an indication he secretly wants to kill Abe, so taking advice from chess champion Magnus Carlsen, Carl Carlson's Norwegian cousin, Homer encourages his father to play again with him, and allows him to win, in hopes of closing the wound from their past. Later, Homer attempts to contact Magnus in order to Skype with him, but is told he does not want to talk with him anymore.

Reception
Dennis Perkins of The A.V. Club gave the episode a C+ stating, "'The Cad And The Hat' is the first credited Simpsons script from Ron Zimmerman, and, while bringing in new blood to the Simpsons’ writers room can be energizing, this episode betrays the series’ tone and internal rules to a distracting degree. Which might be interesting if it were bolder, or a lot funnier. As it is, the episode is dispiriting in how disposably it treats its world, while reaching for a pair of emotional epiphanies that fall flat in the execution."

"The Cad and the Hat" scored a 1.1 rating and was watched by 2.44 million people, making it Fox's highest-rated show of the night.

Cultural References
 The title is a reference to the Dr. Seuss book The Cat in the Hat.
 The Robot Chicken themed couch gag parodies the California Raisins as well as South Park. Additionally, when Homer comes back to the Simpson living room with the sailboat painting, he sees that Marge has replaced its place with Girl with a Pearl Earring.
 Bart's guilt resembles Hugo Simpson from Treehouse of Horror VII.
 Garfield makes an appearance as a costume in the Itchy and Scratchy episode "The Garfield Assassination".

References

External links
 

2017 American television episodes
Robot Chicken
South Park
The Simpsons (season 28) episodes